Elections to the Puducherry Legislative Assembly were held in February 1974, to elect members of the 30 constituencies in Puducherry (then known as Pondicherry), in India. The All India Anna Dravida Munnetra Kazhagam won the most seats, and its leader, S. Ramassamy was appointed as the Chief Minister of Puducherry (French: Ministre en chef de Pondichéry).

Results

Elected members

See also
List of constituencies of the Puducherry Legislative Assembly
1974 elections in India

References

External links
  

1974 State Assembly elections in India
State Assembly elections in Puducherry
1970s in Pondicherry